Robert Maras (born 20 October 1978 in Freiburg) is a German former professional basketball player and basketball coach. Maras was born to immigrants from Croatia.

Professional career
Maras played professional basketball in Spain (Caja San Fernando Sevilla, Palma Aqua Magica, U.B. La Palma), Greece (Egaleo AO) and Germany (USC Freiburg, ALBA Berlin, TuS Lichterfelde, Frankfurt Opel Skyliners, Giessen 46ers, Bayern Munich and TSV Oberhaching Tropics).

National team career
Maras was a member of two of the most successful squads in German national team history. He was a part of the German teams that won the bronze medal at the 2002 FIBA World Championship, and the silver medal at the 2005 EuroBasket. Overall, he was a member of the German national basketball team on 66 occasions.

References

1978 births
Living people
2002 FIBA World Championship players
Aigaleo B.C. players
Alba Berlin players
Centers (basketball)
FC Bayern Munich basketball players
German basketball coaches
German expatriate basketball people in Spain
German expatriates in Greece
German men's basketball players
German people of Croatian descent
Giessen 46ers players
Liga ACB players
Sportspeople from Freiburg im Breisgau
Real Betis Baloncesto players
Skyliners Frankfurt players
UB La Palma players